Talant Mushanbetovich Dujshebaev (born 2 June 1968) is a former handball player who successively played for 4 national teams: Soviet Union, Unified Team, Russia and Spain finally. His most usual demarcation as a player was centre backcourt.

After having success with BM Ciudad Real, he is the current coach of Industria Kielce.

Life and career
He was born in Kirghiz Soviet Socialist Republic in the former Soviet Union, and started his playing career in CSKA Moscow. He participated on the 1992 Olympic Games as a member of the Unified Team and won the gold medal. He also became the top scorer of the games with 47 goals and was elected into the dream team of the tournament. One year later he participated on the 1993 World Championships as a member of the Russian team and won the gold medal again.

After the 1992 Summer Olympics he signed for Teka Cantabria and a few years later he received the Spanish citizenship. Afterwards he played in the Spain men's national handball team for nearly a decade, gaining two Olympic bronze medals in 1996 and 2000, and silver and bronze medals on the European championships. He also gained several individual recognitions in the world championships, like being elected as the best player of the tournament in 1997, but he failed to win any medals with the Spanish team, which finished 4th in both 1999 and 2003. Ironically when Spain finally won the world championship in 2005, Dujshebaev was no longer the member of the squad.

In 2001, after playing for a few years in Germany on club level, he returned to Spain and signed for BM Ciudad Real where he finished his playing career in 2007. In 2005 he became player-manager of the team, and after his retirement he became the full-time manager. His managerial successes include multiple Liga ASOBAL wins with the team, as well as winning the EHF Champions League in 2006, 2008 and 2009.

In 2006 he briefly returned to the field, when one of the Ciudad center backcourt players, Uroš Zorman injured.

He was voted twice as the IHF World Player of the Year, in 1994 and in 1996. He also came in second in the IHF World Player of the Century voting behind Magnus Wislander from Sweden.

In 2014 (8 January) he replaced Bogdan Wenta as head coach of PGE Vive Kielce.

Contemporaneously with his job in Kielce, he has been also coaching the Hungarian men's national handball team since October 8, 2014 until 2016.

He also coached Poland during the 2016 Summer Olympics and the 2017 World Men's Handball Championship in France.

He is the father of Alex Dujshebaev and Daniel Dujshebaev.

Honours
Player

CSKA Moscow
Soviet Handball League: 1986–87
EHF Cup Winners' Cup: 1986–87
EHF Champions League: 1987–88

Teka Cantabria
Liga ASOBAL: 1992–93, 1993–94
Copa del Rey: 1994–95
Copa ASOBAL: 1996–97, 1997–98
Supercopa ASOBAL: 1992–93, 1994–95
EHF Champions League: 1993–94
EHF Cup: 1992–93
IHF Super Globe: 1997

Nettelstedt-Lübbecke
EHF Challenge Cup: 1997–98

Ciudad Real
Liga ASOBAL: 2003–04, 2006–07
Copa del Rey: 2003
Copa ASOBAL: 2004, 2005, 2007
Supercopa ASOBAL: 2005
EHF Champions Trophy: 2005, 2006
EHF Cup Winners' Cup: 2002, 2003

Manager

Ciudad Real
Liga ASOBAL: 2006–07, 2007–08, 2008–09, 2009–10
Copa del Rey: 2008, 2011
Copa ASOBAL: 2005, 2006, 2007, 2008, 2011
Supercopa ASOBAL: 2005, 2008, 2011
EHF Champions League: 2005–06, 2007–08, 2008–09
EHF Champions Trophy: 2005, 2006, 2008
IHF Super Globe: 2007, 2010

Atletico Madrid
Copa del Rey: 2012, 2013
Supercopa ASOBAL: 2012
IHF Super Globe: 2012

Vive Kielce
Polish Superliga: 2014–15, 2015–16, 2016–17, 2017–18, 2018–19, 2019–20, 2020–21, 2021–22
Polish Cup: 2015, 2016, 2017, 2018, 2019, 2021
EHF Champions League: 2015–16

Hungary
2016 European Championship – 12th

Poland
2016 Summer Olympics – 4th

Individual
Top scorer at 1992 Summer Olympics – 47 goals
Best Center back at 1992 Summer Olympics
IHF World Player of the Year (2): 1994, 1996
Best Center back at 1995 World Championship
MVP at 1996 European Championship
Best Center back at 1997 World Championship
MVP at 1997 World Championship
Best Center back at 1998 European Championship
MVP at 2000 Summer Olympics
IHF World Player of the Century – 2nd place
No. 10 jersey retired at BM Ciudad Real in 2005
All-Star Team as Best Head Coach at EHF Champions League: 2015, 2022

See also
List of handballers with 1000 or more international goals

References

External links

1968 births
Living people
Russian male handball players
Russian people of Kyrgyzstani descent
Spanish male handball players
Spanish handball coaches
Spanish people of Kyrgyzstani descent
Liga ASOBAL players
Kyrgyzstani emigrants to Spain
Kyrgyzstani male handball players
Sportspeople from Bishkek
Handball coaches of international teams
Handball players at the 1992 Summer Olympics
Handball players at the 1996 Summer Olympics
Handball players at the 2000 Summer Olympics
Handball players at the 2004 Summer Olympics
Olympic handball players of the Unified Team
Soviet male handball players
Olympic handball players of Spain
Olympic gold medalists for the Unified Team
Olympic bronze medalists for Spain
BM Ciudad Real players
Olympic medalists in handball
Handball-Bundesliga players
Medalists at the 2000 Summer Olympics
Medalists at the 1996 Summer Olympics
Medalists at the 1992 Summer Olympics